Dogaressa was the official title of the wife of the Doge of Venice. The title was unique for Venice: while the head of the Republic of Genoa were also called Doge, the wives of the Doges of Genoa were not called Dogaressa, nor did they have such a public position.

History
The position of the dogaressa was regulated by the laws of the Republic, which specified which duties and rights she had, and what was prohibited for the title holder. These rights changed several times during the history of the Republic. The first bearer of the title was reportedly Dogaressa Carola in the 800s, and the last was Elisabetta Grimani in the 1790s.

Position
Just like the Doge, the dogaressa was crowned, made a Solemn Entry, and gave a vow of loyalty (promissione ducale) to the republic upon her coronation. The symbols of her rank were a golden veil and a crown in a similar shape as that of the doge. Similar to a queen, the dogaressa was provided with a household of ladies-in-waiting. The coronation of the dogaressa was abolished during certain periods, as specified below.

Formally, the dogaressa had no political rights whatsoever, and her task was to participate in the representational life of the republic and official ceremonies and rituals designed to personify the glory of the state, and had as such a very visible public role. She was expected to act as the formal protector of certain guilds and trades, and could as such play in important part in the role of this trades within the state, something several dogaressas are known to have done. Alicia Giustiniani, for example, played an important part in Venetian commerce and business because of this role.

Though law refused any influence over state affairs to the dogaressa, some wielded a great deal of influence over the affairs of state in practice, most notably Felicia Cornaro.

When the dogaressa became a widow, she was socially expected to become a nun. However, there was no actual law to require this, and some widowed dogaressas refused to follow this custom, though it was considered scandalous.

Changes in position
During the centuries, the regulations around the dogaressa introduced laws to restrict her rights: in the 13th-century, the dogaressa was banned from receiving dignitaries and make public donations on her own, and in 1342, a law banned her from conducting business affairs of her own.

The coronation ceremony of the dogaressa did not occur between that of Taddea Michiel in 1478 and Zilia Dandolo in 1556; after the coronation of Morosina Morosini in 1597, the coronation of a dogaressa was deemed unnecessary in 1645 and the other ceremonies around her suppressed to a minimum. The last dogaressa to be crowned was Elisabetta Querini in 1694, after which the ceremony was permanently abolished. After the tenure of Elisabetta Querini, most other ceremonial privileges of the dogaressa was abolished as well: in 1700, she was no longer permitted to wear a crown and receive gifts from dignitaries. In 1763, the Solemn Entry was revived by the wish of the Doge for Pisana Conaro, who was the last dogaressa to perform it.

List of Dogaressas of Venice
 804-811: Carola
 811-827: Elena
 827-830: Felicita
 888-912: Angela Sanudo
 942-959: Arcielda Candiano
 959-966: Giovanniccia Candiano
 966-976: Waldrada of Tuscany
 976-978: Felicia Malipiero
 979-991: Marina Candiano
 991-1009: Maria Candiano
 1009-1026: Grimelda of Hungary
 1075-1083: Theodora Doukaina Selvo
 1084-1096: Cornella Bembo
 1096-1102: Felicia Cornaro
 1102-1116: Matelda Falier
 1116-1130: Alicia Michiel
 1148-1156: Sofia
 1156-1172: Felicita Maria di Boemondo
 1172-1178: Cecilia
 1192-1205: Felicita Bembo
 1205-1229: Constance of Sicily
 1229-1240: Maria Storlato
 1242-1249: Valdrada of Sicily
 1252-1268: Loicia da Prata
 1268-1275: Marchesina Ghisi
 1275-1280: Jacobina
 1280-1289: Caterina
 1289-1310: Tommasina Morosini
 1310-1312: Agnese
 1312-1329: Franchesina
 1329-1339: Elisabetta
 1339-1342: Giustina Cappello
 1342-1354:  Francesca Morosini 
 1354-1355: Aluycia Gradenigo
 1355-1356: Marina Cappello
 1361-1365: Maria Giustinian
 1365-1367: Caterina Corner
 1382-1382: Cristina Condulmer
 1382-1400: Agnese
 1400-1413: Marina Galina
 1423-1457: Marina Nani
 1457-1462: Giovanna Dandolo
 1462-1471: Cristina Sanudo
 1471-1472: Aliodea Morosini
 1473-1474: Contarina Contarini Morosini
 1474-1476: Laura Zorzi
 1476-1478: Regina Gradenigo
 1478-1485: Taddea Michiel
 1485-1486: Lucia Ruzzini
 1486-1501: Elisabetta Soranzo
 1501-1521: Giustina Giustiniani
 1521-1523: Caterina Loredan
 1523-1538: Benedetta Vendramin
 1538-1545: Maria Pasqualigo
 1545-1553: Alicia Giustiniani
 1556-1559: Zilia Dandolo
 1559-1567: Elena Diedo
 1567-1570: Maria Cappello
 1570-1577: Loredana Marcello
 1577-1578: Cecilia Contarini
 1578-1585: Arcangela Canali
 1585-1595: Laura Morosini
 1595-1606: Morosina Morosini
 1618-1623: Elena Barbarigo
 1625-1629: Chiara Dolfin
 1655-1656: Paolina Loredan
 1656-1656: Andreana Priuli
 1656-1658: Elisabetta Pisani
 1658-1659: Lucia Barbarigo
 1694-1700: Elisabetta Querini
 1709-1722: Laura Cornaro
 1735-1741: Elena Badoer
 1763-1769: Pisana Cornaro
 1771-1779: Polissena Contarini Da Mula
 1779-1789: Margherita Dalmet
 1789-1792: Elisabetta Grimani

References

 Staley, Edgcumbe:  The dogaressas of Venice (The wives of the doges), London : T. W. Laurie, 1910 

Noble titles
Republic of Venice